Yafit Greenberg (9 August 1951 – 30 November 2021), commonly known as G. Yafit (Gimmel Yafit), was an Israeli businesswoman specialising in advertising.

Biography
Greenberg was born Yaffa Maimon in Bnei Brak in 1951 to a traditionalist Jewish family who had immigrated from Tripoli in Libya, and was one of five daughters. She studied geography and education at Bar-Ilan University.

She began working in marketing for Lahitun magazine, before switching to advertising, establishing the G. Yafit company in 1977. The company initially posted advertisements in newspapers, the first of which was an advert for Tadiran refrigerators in Yedioth Ahronoth. When commercial television began broadcasting in 1993, she began offering low-cost advertisement slots in a similar style to the newspaper adverts. Her unusual advertising style sees her front the advert herself to talk about the product. Her daughter-in-law, Maya Yeshayahu, also began appearing alongside her in the adverts.

In June 2014, a group of investors led by G. Yafit acquired the Steimatzky bookstore chain from Markstone Capital Partners.

She died of cancer on 30 November 2021, at the age of 70.

References

External links

1951 births
2021 deaths
Bar-Ilan University alumni
21st-century Israeli businesswomen
21st-century Israeli businesspeople
Israeli television personalities
People from Bnei Brak
Israeli people of Libyan-Jewish descent
21st-century Israeli Jews
20th-century businesswomen
20th-century Israeli businesspeople
Deaths from cancer in Israel